Vadu Pașii is a commune in Buzău County, Muntenia, Romania. It is composed of six villages: Băjani, Focșănei, Gura Câlnăului, Scurtești, Stăncești and Vadu Pașii.

Natives
 Romulus Bucuroiu

References

Communes in Buzău County
Localities in Muntenia